The Division of Gilmore is an Australian electoral division in the state of New South Wales.

History

The Division of Gilmore was created in 1984 when the House of Representatives was expanded, and was named after Dame Mary Gilmore, the poet and author. The seat was first won by John Sharp of the National Party. The electorate originally included the areas of Goulburn and Southern Highlands but, following a redistribution, the seat moved to its current boundaries along the New South Wales South Coast. As a consequence, Sharp moved to the nearby seat of Hume in 1993. He served in the First Howard Ministry until he resigned in 1997 due to the "travel rorts affair".

The seat was won by the ALP's Peter Knott in 1993, but he was defeated at the 1996 election by Joanna Gash of the Liberal Party. The seat was considered marginal after the 1996 and 1998 elections, but a big swing in 2001 saw Gash hold the seat by a much larger margin. That was cut back to a margin of about 4% in 2007.

Gilmore's boundaries were redrawn before the 2010 election, making the seat a notional Labor one, but Gash gained a 5.7% swing. She announced her retirement in 2012, and was later elected Mayor of Shoalhaven.

At the 2013 federal election, Gash was succeeded by Liberal candidate Ann Sudmalis, who won despite a 2.7% swing to Labor. Sudmalis suffered a further 3% swing in the 2016 election, but narrowly won a second term by only 1,503 of the two-party-preferred vote. On 17 September 2018, Sudmalis announced that she would not contest the forthcoming election, blaming what she called ego-driven bullying, betrayal and backstabbing by Gareth Ward, a Liberal member of state parliament for an electorate that overlaps hers.

On 22 January 2019, the prime minister, Scott Morrison, announced that Warren Mundine would be the Liberal Party's candidate for the seat in the 2019 election, after Mundine joined the party the same day. Mundine, and former Liberal party member Grant Schultz, who ran as an independent, were defeated by the ALP's Fiona Phillips. She retained the seat at the 2022 election by 379 votes.

Boundaries
Since 1984, federal electoral division boundaries in Australia have been determined at redistributions by a redistribution committee appointed by the Australian Electoral Commission. Redistributions occur for the boundaries of divisions in a particular state, and they occur every seven years, or sooner if a state's representation entitlement changes or when divisions of a state are malapportioned.

The division is located in the Shoalhaven and the southern Illawarra regions. It covers the entirety of the Kiama and Shoalhaven local government areas and the northern parts of the Eurobodalla. The most northerly part of the electorate is Minnamurra and the southerly Point is just south of Moruya. The western boundary includes much of the, Budawang and Morton National Parks.

Towns and suburbs includes Batemans Bay, Berry, Bomaderry, Callala Bay, Culburra Beach, Gerringong, Kangaroo Valley, Kiama, Milton, Minnamurra, Nowra, Sussex Inlet, Ulladulla, Moruya and Greenwell Point.

Members

Election results

References

External links
 Division of Gilmore - Australian Electoral Commission

Electoral divisions of Australia
Constituencies established in 1984
1984 establishments in Australia
South Coast (New South Wales)